Sigmaringendorf is a small town in the district of Sigmaringen in Baden-Württemberg in Germany. In Sigmaringendorf the small river Lauchert flows into the Danube. There is an open-air-theatre in Sigmaringendorf, it's called Waldbühne Sigmaringendorf.

Mayors
Since September 2018 Phillip Schwaiger is the mayor of Sigmaringendorf.

Alois Henne (1980-2018) 
Wilhelm Siebenrock (1946–1953)
Alois Maucher (1953–1980)

References

Sigmaringen (district)
Populated places on the Danube